Astylar (from Gr. ἀ-, privative, and στῦλος, a column) is an architectural term given to a class of design  in which neither columns nor pilasters are used for decorative purposes; thus the Riccardi and Strozzi palaces in Florence are astylar in their design, in contradistinction to Palladio's palaces at Vicenza, which are columnar.

References

Architectural terminology